Artie D. Valentine (August 25, 1927 – November 14, 2020), was an American politician who was a Democratic member of the Nevada General Assembly. He was Majority Leader in 1964. Valentine was a conductor with the Southern Pacific Transportation Company and the president of Autoland, Inc.

References

1927 births
2020 deaths
Nevada Democrats
People from Cosby, Tennessee